Noah Fadiga (born 3 December 1999) is a Belgian professional footballer who plays as a right-back for French  club Brest.

Career
A youth product of Club Brugge, Fadiga joined Volendam on loan for the 2019–20 season. He made his professional debut with Volendam in a 1–1 Eerste Divisie tie with Helmond Sport on 9 August 2020.

Fadiga signed with Heracles Almelo in the Eredivisie on 19 July 2020.

Personal life
Fadiga is the son of the retired Senegal international footballer Khalilou Fadiga.

References

External links
 
 Career stats & Profile - Voetbal International

1999 births
Living people
Belgian people of Senegalese descent
Belgian footballers
Footballers from Bruges
Association football fullbacks
Eredivisie players
Eerste Divisie players
Ligue 1 players
Club Brugge KV players
FC Volendam players
Heracles Almelo players
Stade Brestois 29 players
Belgian expatriate footballers
Belgian expatriate sportspeople in the Netherlands
Expatriate footballers in the Netherlands
Belgian expatriate sportspeople in France
Expatriate footballers in France